Banova Jaruga  is a village in Croatia.

See also

Banova Jaruga railway station

Populated places in Sisak-Moslavina County
Kutina